Earle Herdan is an American film editor. He was nominated for an Academy Award in the category Best Film Editing for the film The Secret of Santa Vittoria.

Selected filmography 
 The Secret of Santa Vittoria (1969; co-nominated with William Lyon)

References

External links 

Possibly living people
Year of birth missing (living people)
Place of birth missing (living people)
American film editors
American television editors